Ravulapalem is a village in Ravulapalem Mandal,Konaseema 

Konaseema district of Andhra Pradesh. Ravulapalem is the entry point for the lushy green Konaseema Delta region, often called the Kerala of Andhra. Ravulapalem is well known for its Banana Market, diverse cuisine, hospitality of its people & numerous trucking services that caters to PAN India.

Governance

The civic body of Ravulapalem is going to be upgraded as municipal council.

Transport 

Ravulapalem is located on NH 216A. The nearest major railway stations are Rajahmundry railway station and Tanuku railway station and the nearest airport is Rajahmundry Airport which is 40km away.

References

Villages in Ravulapalem mandal